Richard Ntumka (born 3 May 1996) is a South African cricketer. He made his Twenty20 debut for Northern Cape in the 2017 Africa T20 Cup on 10 September 2017. He made his List A debut on 21 March 2021, for Northern Cape in the 2020–21 CSA Provincial One-Day Challenge.

References

External links
 

1996 births
Living people
South African cricketers
Northern Cape cricketers
Place of birth missing (living people)